High Park was a provincial electoral district in the west-end of the old City of Toronto, Ontario, Canada. It was represented in the Legislative Assembly of Ontario from 1926 to 1975. It was mostly redistributed into the High Park—Swansea electoral district for the 1975 Ontario general election.

The High Park provincial electoral district was notable for its electors defeating the incumbent Premier, and their Member of Provincial Parliament, George Drew, in the 1948 provincial election. He lost his seat over the issue of temperance; even though his Conservatives were returned with a majority government. The old City of West Toronto Junction had been an alcohol-free area since even before it was annexed by Toronto back in 1909, and those "dry-laws" were still current at the time of the 1948 election. So when Drew's government passed a new law that allowed "cocktail bars" to open in the province, his local constituents were not pleased, allowing the aptly named temperance candidate, "Temperance Bill" Temple of the Ontario Co-operative Commonwealth Federation to win.

The provincial riding had a number of colourful Members of Provincial Parliament (MPPs) including Drew, and his successor William Horace Temple as well as the district's final representative, Doctor Morton Shulman. The district was abolished during the 1975 redistribution, placing most of it in the new High Park—Swansea district. As of 2013, the territory it represented belongs in the current Parkdale—High Park, York South—Weston and Davenport districts.

Members of Provincial Parliament

Election results

1926 Boundaries

1934 Boundaries

1943 Boundaries

1951 Boundaries

1955 Boundaries

1963 Boundaries

1967 boundaries

References

Notes

Citations

Former provincial electoral districts of Ontario
Provincial electoral districts of Toronto